The Communauté de communes Terres du Haut Berry is a communauté de communes, an intercommunal structure, in the Cher department, in the Centre-Val de Loire region, central France. It was created in January 2017 by the merger of the former communautés de communes Terres Vives, Hautes Terres en Haut Berry, and Terroirs d'Angillon. Its area is 685.3 km2, and its population was 26,017 in 2018. Its seat is in Les Aix-d'Angillon.

Communes
The communauté de communes consists of the following 30 communes:

Achères
Les Aix-d'Angillon
Allogny
Allouis
Aubinges
Azy
Brécy
La Chapelotte
Fussy
Henrichemont
Humbligny
Menetou-Salon
Montigny
Morogues
Moulins-sur-Yèvre
Neuilly-en-Sancerre
Neuvy-Deux-Clochers
Parassy
Pigny
Quantilly
Rians
Saint-Céols
Saint-Éloy-de-Gy
Sainte-Solange
Saint-Georges-sur-Moulon
Saint-Martin-d'Auxigny
Saint-Palais
Soulangis
Vasselay
Vignoux-sous-les-Aix

References

Terres du Haut Berry
Terres du Haut Berry